Jesse Rohtla (born March 8, 1988) is a Finnish ice hockey player. He is currently playing for GKS Katowice of the Polska Hokej Liga.

Rohtla made his SM-liiga debut playing with Lahti Pelicans during the 2008–09 SM-liiga season.

References

External links

1988 births
Living people
Asplöven HC players
Finnish ice hockey centres
GKS Katowice (ice hockey) players
Kulager Petropavl players
JKH GKS Jastrzębie players
Lahti Pelicans players
Mikkelin Jukurit players
HK Neman Grodno players
Sportspeople from Lahti